Manya Hirshbeyn (22 February 1890–18 August 1944), known primarily as Miriam Ulinover or Miryem Ulinover, was a Yiddish-language poet. She is regarded for her folkloristic style and for being one of few religious and Orthodox Jewish women poets of her time.

Personal life 
Ulinover was born on 22 February 1890 in Łódź to parents Shimen and Sheyndl (née Gerzon) Hirshbeyn. Her parents divorced in 1905. She spent some of her childhood with her maternal grandfather, Talmudic scholar Shaye Gerzon, in the shtetl Krzepice (near modern-day Częstochowa, Poland). Ulinover, however, lived for the majority of her life in Łódź.

Writing career 
Sholem Aleichem inspired Ulinover to start writing when he met her in Łódź in 1905. Ulinover is known for writing folk poetry and is renowned for being one of few religiously observant Jewish women to write poetry.

Some of Ulinover's poetry was featured in Ezra Korman's 1928 collection of Yiddish women poetry titled Yidishe dikhterins.

In 1922, Ulinover published her own book of poetry with the help of David Frischmann, titled Der bobes oytser.

Literary gatherings 
Before the war, Ulinover started a salon, bringing other renowned Yiddish writers to her home. Some of her interlocutors included Chaim Leib Fox, Rikuda Potash, Mirl Erdberg-Shatan, Simkha-Bunim Shayevitsh, Yeshayahu Shpigl, Alter Shnur, Yerakhmiel Briks, and Yitskhok Goldkorn. After being interned in the Łódź Ghetto in 1940, she continued to host her literary gatherings.

Death and legacy 
On 18 August 1944, Ulinover was deported to Auschwitz upon the Łódź Ghetto's liquidation. She was gassed a few days later. While it is believed that she continued to write in the ghetto, many of her manuscripts are reported to have been lost during the Holocaust.

References 

Yiddish-language poets
1890 births
1944 deaths
Auschwitz concentration camp prisoners
Łódź Ghetto inmates
Polish Jews who died in the Holocaust
Jewish Polish writers
Jewish women writers
20th-century Polish women writers
Polish women poets
Jewish poets
20th-century Polish poets
Writers from Łódź